The Bishop of Hulme was an episcopal title used by a suffragan bishop of the Church of England Diocese of Manchester, in the Province of York, England. The See was created by Order in Council on 11 October 1923 (under the Suffragans Nomination Act 1888) and took its name after Hulme, an area of the city of Manchester.

Following the retirement of Stephen Lowe, the last suffragan Bishop of Hulme, in July 2009, the post was axed and its duties were divided between the remaining suffragan bishops of Bolton and of Middleton, who assist the diocesan Bishop of Manchester in overseeing the diocese.

List of bishops

References

External links
 Crockford's Clerical Directory - Listings

 
Hulme
Bishop of Hulme